This was the first edition of the tournament.

Kristina Mladenovic won the title, defeating Tamara Zidanšek in the final, 6–1, 3–6, 7–5.

Seeds

Draw

Finals

Top half

Bottom half

References

External Links
Main Draw

Open Feu Aziz Zouhir - Singles